Tangen Church is a parish church of the Church of Norway in Stange Municipality in Innlandet county, Norway. It is located in the village of Tangen. It is one of the churches for the Tangen parish which is part of the Hamar domprosti (deanery) in the Diocese of Hamar. The white, wooden church was built in an octagonal design in 1861 using plans drawn up by the architect Christian Henrik Grosch. The church seats about 450 people.

History
In 1837, Berte and Jon Grimerud donated land from the Tangen farm to the Stange Church parish. It took some time, but on 23 March 1857, the new Tangen parish was separated from the Stange parish. Plans for a new church on the donated land began soon afterwards. The church was designed by Christian Heinrich Grosch and the lead builder was Hans Gulbrandsen Røisi. The nave is octagonal and choir and church porch are connected on opposite ends of the octagon. There are sacristies in the extension of the choir. The middle part of the nave has a raised roof supported by eight columns. Grosch designed many octagonal churches in Norway, but this is the only one with a raised central part which is supposed to be influenced by stave church architecture. Tangen church was consecrated on 9 August 1861 by the local Provost Paul Winsnes (the husband of Hanna Winsnes who wrote a famous Norwegian cookbook).

Media gallery

See also
List of churches in Hamar

References

Stange
Churches in Innlandet
Octagonal churches in Norway
Wooden churches in Norway
19th-century Church of Norway church buildings
Churches completed in 1861
1861 establishments in Norway